The Campeonato Paraense Second Division, nicknamed Segundinha, is the second tier professional football league in the Brazilian state of Pará. Run by the Federação Paraense de Futebol, the championship is contested between 23 clubs, in which the two best teams are promoted to Campeonato Paraense and the two worst teams are relegated to Paraense 3rd Division.

List of champions

Titles by team

Vila Rica – 3
Bragantino – 3
Pedreira – 2
Vênus – 2
Abaeté – 1
Águia de Marabá – 1
Ananindeua – 1
Cametá - 1
Carajás – 1
Castanhal – 1
Independente – 1
Itupiranga – 1
Paragominas – 1
Parauapebas – 1
Pinheirense – 1
São Francisco – 1
Sport Belém – 1
Tapajós – 1
Time Negra – 1
Tiradentes – 1
Tuna Luso – 1
Amazônia Independente – 1

External links
FPF Official Website

Campeonato Paraense